The 2020 NBL season (officially known as the 2020 NBL Showdown) was the 39th season of the National Basketball League.

The regular season was set to commence on Thursday 9 April and end on Sunday 12 July, with the finals then taking place between 16–24 July. However, following the coronavirus outbreak in early to mid March 2020, the season was suspended indefinitely. After two months of deliberation and in the wake of easing coronavirus restrictions, the league announced a revised competition format for 2020 beginning on Tuesday 23 June and ending with the grand final on Saturday 1 August.

The 2020 season was initially set to feature eight teams following the withdrawal of the Southern Huskies and Super City Rangers and the inclusion of the Franklin Bulls for the first time. However, three of the top four teams in 2019 (Wellington Saints, Hawke's Bay Hawks and Southland Sharks) decided not to enter the modified competition. This left the door open for the inclusion of the Otago Nuggets, a team who were looking to re-enter the league in 2021 for the first time since 2014, and the Huskies. Coinciding with the announcement of a revised 2020 competition, the Huskies franchise relocated from Tasmania to Auckland and became the Auckland Huskies.

The 2020 season began on 23 June, with all seven teams playing up to three games per week over six weeks. The season concluded on 1 August with the Otago Nuggets defeating the Manawatu Jets in the grand final to win their maiden NBL championship. All teams were based in Auckland, with all games played out of The Trusts Arena.

Team information

Summary

Regular season standings

Finals
Tuesday 28 July
Elimination Final 1 – 6th vs 7th

Qualifying Final – 1st vs 2nd

Wednesday 29 July
Elimination Final 2 – 3rd vs Winner EF1

Elimination Final 3 – 4th vs 5th

Thursday 30 July
Semi Final 1 – Winner QF vs Lowest EF Winner

Semi Final 2 – Loser QF vs Highest EF Winner

Saturday 1 August
Grand Final – Winner SF1 vs Winner SF2

Awards

Statistics leaders
Stats as of the end of the regular season

Regular season
 Most Valuable Player: Tom Vodanovich (Manawatu Jets)
 Defensive Player of the Year: Jarrod Kenny (Otago Nuggets) and Izayah Mauriohooho-Le'afa (Auckland Huskies)
 Youth Player of the Year: Taane Samuel (Manawatu Jets)
 Coach of the Year: Brent Matehaere (Otago Nuggets)
 All-Star Five:
 G: Derone Raukawa (Taranaki Mountainairs)
 G: Izayah Mauriohooho-Le'afa (Auckland Huskies)
 F: Jordan Ngatai (Otago Nuggets)
 F: Marcel Jones (Taranaki Mountainairs)
 C: Tom Vodanovich (Manawatu Jets)

Finals
 Grand Final MVP: Jordan Hunt (Otago Nuggets)

References

External links
NBL Draft player pool 
NBL Draft recap and rosters 
Team-by-team guide
"Saints, Southland Sharks non-starters as innovative Kiwi NBL battles to achieve liftoff" at stuff.co.nz
"Basketball: NZ national league facing player exodus under proposed format" at newshub.co.nz
"Nelson coach hoping to avoid Giant headaches ahead of shortened NBL" at stuff.co.nz
"Otago Nuggets select Jordan Ngatai first in NBL Showdown draft" at stuff.co.nz
"Opportunity, welfare, representation: Will NZNBL's Showdown thrive despite challenges?" at pickandroll.com.au
"New Zealand NBL boss Justin Nelson defends revamped competition" at stuff.co.nz
"Meet Justin Nelson, the workaholic Aussie who might have saved New Zealand basketball" at stuff.co.nz

National Basketball League (New Zealand) seasons
NBL